Ivaylo Sokolov (born 15 September 1984) is a Bulgarian footballer who plays for Nesebar as a defender. He previously played in the A PFG for Marek Dupnitsa.

References

1984 births
Living people
Bulgarian footballers
First Professional Football League (Bulgaria) players
FC Lokomotiv 1929 Sofia players
PFC Rodopa Smolyan players
PFC Marek Dupnitsa players
OFC Vihren Sandanski players
Birkirkara F.C. players
Floriana F.C. players
PFC Nesebar players
Association football defenders